The Wreck of the Dunbar or The Yeoman's Wedding is a 1912 Australian silent film directed by Gaston Mervale starring Louise Lovely. The plot concerns the shipwreck of the Dunbar, one of Australia's worst maritime disasters. It is considered a lost film.

Plot
A contemporary advertisement claimed the film featured the following scenes:
the Old English home;
the Love Intense;
the terrific struggle, man to man; 
two thrilling Australian Scenes;
the terrible gap; 
the doomed ship;
the wreck of the Dunbar in all its awful realism;
the rescue of the sole survivor;
the daring feat performed on the actual spot.

Production
The script, written by P.W. Marony, was based on a popular play which had been performed since the 1880s.

The film was the sole feature produced by Universal Films Ltd, a company formed in Sydney in May 1912 (which had no connection to the Hollywood Studio of the same name). It took over the assets of American Australasian Film Service and Australian Life Biograph with the intention of producing and importing movies.

Reception
The film appears to have been successful, running for three weeks in Sydney. A few years after the film was released the sole survivor of the Dunbar died.

References

External links

1912 films
Australian drama films
Australian black-and-white films
Australian silent feature films
Seafaring films based on actual events
Lost Australian films
1912 drama films
1912 lost films
Lost drama films
Films directed by Gaston Mervale
Silent drama films
Silent adventure films
1910s English-language films